Blackbird Raum is a folk punk band from Santa Cruz, California, formed in 2004. They are known for their frantic live shows and anarchist politics. They have toured Europe and the U.S.

2004-2007: Formation and demos 
Blackbird Raum was formed in 2004 by banjoist CPN and accordionist Zack while wilderness squatting in Santa Cruz, California. The band was haphazard at first, playing gigs and busking with a band randomly composed of other squatters living in or around Santa Cruz. They made their first dollar from a man on a date who paid them to leave. During this period, they wrote songs including "Honey in the Hair" and "Coal" and recorded a demo. After some frustrations with chaotic nature of the lineup, CPN left Santa Cruz for a year to play in other projects. When he returned he and Zack agreed to try the band again and a lineup was cemented with the addition of K.C. on washboard, David on washtub bass and Mars on musical saw and mandolin. They quickly wrote new material and recorded what was to be their first album, Purse-Seine, named after the poem by Robinson Jeffers.

2007-2010: Swidden 
The band were unsatisfied with Purse-Seine and produced the follow-up, Swidden, promoting it with a full U.S. tour and several other tours. Two years later, they followed up with Under the Starling Host. During the release of UTSH, the band members set up a small collectively run anarchist record label called Black Powder to support other radical folk projects, including the Hail Seizures. After the release of UTSH, the band took a hiatus for a few years, playing few gigs. After the 2011 release of the Hail Seizures, Blackbird Raum split 7-inch K.C. left the band.

2012-2013: "False Weavers"  
In 2012, Blackbird Raum regrouped, replacing K.C. on washboard with Allen Degenerate and signing to Silver Sprocket Bicycle Club for the release of False Weavers in 2013. Recorded at John Vanderslice's Tiny Telephone studio, the album marked a change in sound, with psychedelic touches the band has attributed to their love of Chumbawamba and Crass. Five months of touring in the US and Europe followed.

2015-present: "Destroying," Mars's departure, and "NeverMind The Ballads" 
Following the release of False Weavers, the band teamed up with Dublin based folk band "Lankum" (then called Lynched) to create a new album "Destroying," released in 2015. The bands toured together before the release of the album. After the tour, the band announced the departure of Mars. Mars had been contributing to vocals and songwriting greatly, as well as playing the mandolin, musical saw and other instruments. After Mars left, the band took a short break before a short tour followed by the release of an EP titled "Nevermind The Ballads" in 2016.

Lyrical and ideological influences 
Blackbird Raum's lyrics tend to paint a bleak picture of modern society, focusing on issues like the destruction of the environment, mental illness, and class warfare. They have described themselves as eco-anarchists.

In an interview with The Sunday Times of Malta, banjo player CPN had this to say about their political views:

The lyrics and song names often contain references to historical events, ancient myths and cultural icons:
 
"Silent Spring," which references the book Silent Spring by Rachel Carson
"Lucasville," a song about the riot in the Southern Ohio Correctional Facility
"The Helm of Ned Kelly," talking about the Australian bushranger Ned Kelly
"Old One Eye," making an incorrect reference to Odin's sacrifice in Norse Mythology.
"Ravachol in Valhalla" which references the Illegalist anarchist Ravachol

Blackbird Raum makes use of epigraphs from many poets and writers. Among them are William Blake, George R. Stewart, Sir Thomas Malory, Gary Snyder, Kenneth Rexroth and Black Elk.

Discography 
 Purse-Seine – 2007, Quiver Distro
 Swidden – 2008, Quiver Distro
 Under the Starling Host – 2009, Black Powder Records
 Split 7-inch w/ Hail Seizures – 2011, Go Records
 False Weavers – 2013, Silver Sprocket
 Destroying – 2015, Silver Sprocket
 Nevermind the Ballads – 2016, No Time Records

References

External links 
 "Official Bandcamp"
 Official Facebook page
 Official site
Audio/video media
"Blackbird Raum Silent Spring Santa Cruz", "Courant Times", YouTube, January 3, 2009.

Anarcho-punk groups
Gypsy punk groups
Folk punk groups
Musical groups established in 2004
Musical groups from California
Musicians from Santa Cruz, California